Rio Pinar is a census-designated place and unincorporated area in Orange County, Florida, United States. The population was 5,211 at the 2010 census. It is part of the Orlando–Kissimmee Metropolitan Statistical Area and is home to the private Rio Pinar Country Club.

Geography

Demographics

References

Unincorporated communities in Orange County, Florida
Census-designated places in Orange County, Florida
Greater Orlando
Census-designated places in Florida
Unincorporated communities in Florida